Yad Mordechai (lit. Memorial of Mordechai) is a kibbutz in Southern Israel. Located 10 km (6.2 mi) south of Ashkelon, it falls under the jurisdiction of Hof Ashkelon Regional Council.

History
The community was founded in 1936 by Hashomer Hatzair members from Poland and initially organized themselves in a kibbutz called Mitzpe Yam close to Netanya, which was also founded in 1936. However, the 14 dunams allocated to the kibbutz were insufficient to develop the kibbutz. As part of settlement in the Negev, the community moved to its site near Ashkelon in December 1943. The kibbutz was renamed in memorial to Mordechai Anielewicz, who was the first commander of the Jewish Fighting Organization in the Warsaw Ghetto uprising. During the 1948 Arab–Israeli War, the kibbutz was attacked by Egypt in the Battle of Yad Mordechai.

Among the many Holocaust memorials in Israel, the "From Holocaust to Revival Museum" especially commemorates Jewish resistance against the Nazis as well as the 1948 Battle of Yad Mordechai. The statue of Anielewicz by Nathan Rapoport clutching a grenade, next to the water tower which was destroyed by the Egyptians in May 1948, is a noted symbol of the kibbutz.

After 1948, Yad Mordechai expanded on the land of the Palestinian village of Hiribya, which the Palestinians abandoned during the 1948 Arab–Israeli War.

Economy
The Yad Mordechai honey, jam and olive oil brands have been partnered with the Strauss food group.

Notable people
 Motty Perry (born 1949), Israeli academic

References

Further reading
Larkin, Margaret (1968) The Hand of Mordechai New York/South Brunswick; originally published as "The Six Days of Yad Mordechai" by the Yad Mordechai Museum in Hebrew in 1963, and in English in 1965.

External links

Official website 
“From Holocaust to Revival Museum in Kibbutz Yad Mordechai" website
Yad Mordechai Travelnet

Kibbutzim
Kibbutz Movement
Populated places established in 1936
1936 establishments in Mandatory Palestine
Populated places established in 1943
1943 establishments in Mandatory Palestine
Jewish villages depopulated during the 1948 Arab–Israeli War
Gaza envelope
Populated places in Southern District (Israel)
Polish-Jewish culture in Israel